Alanallur is a gram panchayat in the Palakkad district, state of Kerala, India. It is a local government organization that serves the villages of Alanallur-I, Alanallur-II and Alanallur-III.

Picture Gallery

References

External links

Gram panchayats in Palakkad district